Legal lexicography is the complex of activities concerned with the development of theories and principles for the design, compilation, use, and evaluation of dictionaries within the field of law, see e.g. Nielsen 1994.

Overview 

As a branch of the general discipline lexicography, legal lexicography may be divided into theoretical legal lexicography and practical legal lexicography. The result of practical legal lexicography is called a law dictionary. Law dictionaries are available in print and online.

Legal lexicography is not just about terms, but also about language and usage. Especially when making bilingual law dictionaries, the lexicographers need to take a broad view of what legal lexicography involves. Most users of bilingual law dictionaries need information about language and law, and the lexicographer's task is to present the information as clearly and structured as possible. This involves various lexicographic analyses: user research, dictionary typology, and a clear structure for presenting and linking the information in the dictionary. The information must be presented in such a way that the user is not burdened with heavy lexicographic information costs.

As pointed out in Nielsen 1994, law dictionaries can serve different functions. The traditional law dictionary with definitions of legal terms serves to help users understand the legal texts they read (a communicative function) or to help users acquire knowledge about legal matters independent of any text ( a cognitive function) – such law dictionaries are usually monolingual. Bilingual law dictionaries may serve several functions. First, they may have entry words in one language and definitions in another language – these dictionaries give help to understand legal texts, usually written in a foreign language, and to acquire knowledge, usually about a foreign legal system. Second, bilingual law dictionaries with entry words in one language and equivalents in another language provide help to translate legal texts, into or from a foreign language, and sometimes also to produce legal texts, usually in a foreign language.

The aim of legal lexicography is to suggest principles and strategies that lead to good law dictionaries. A good monolingual law dictionary will contain relevant terms with appropriate definitions, and if the purpose of the dictionary is to facilitate legal translation, e.g. a bilingual law dictionary, it will contain definitions, translation equivalents and other relevant information such as collocation and phrases in the source language and in the target language, as described in Nielsen 1994.

Important aspects
Based on the discussion in Nielsen 1994, there are a number of aspects that lexicographers should take into account when working with legal lexicography. One of the important aspects of legal lexicography is to establish a profile of the intended dictionary users. This is particularly significant if the dictionary is to be used by other than "native" lawyers, for instance bilingual law dictionaries for translation. A user profile should focus on the following competencies: The users' legal competence in their "native" field of law; the users' legal competence in the foreign field of law; the users' legal-language competence in their native language; the users' legal-language competence in the foreign language. When lexicographers have thus profiled the intended user group they have a clear picture of what types of data to include in the dictionary so that it can be of the most help to the users. The profile will also help lexicographers presenting the necessary data, such as definitions, in the appropriate language so that, in particular, "foreign" users can benefit from the data. The typical example is where a European continental lawyer consults an English law dictionary.

Another important aspect is the scope of coverage of a dictionary. This refers to the extent to which a law dictionary covers the field of law. The basic distinction is between general-field dictionaries and sub-field dictionaries. A general-field dictionary of law is one whose purpose is to cover the entire field of law as represented by all its subfields, and a sub-field dictionary of law is one whose purpose is to cover one or few distinct sub-fields of law, for instance a dictionary of contract law and a dictionary of family law. It is obvious that more data about the law and legal language can be included in a sub-field dictionary than in a general-field dictionary of law of the same size. The result is that sub-field dictionaries can give a much more detailed description of the law and its language than other types of dictionary.

See also
Legal writing

Relevant literature
 Nielsen, Sandro. The Bilingual LSP Dictionary. Principles and Practice for Legal Language. (Gunter Narr Verlag, 1994).
 Stone, John. 'The Law, the Alphabet, and Samuel Johnson.' Anniversary Essays on Johnson's Dictionary, ed. Jack Lynch and Anne McDermott(Cambridge UP, 2005).

External links
Short annotated list of publications

Legal communication
Legal writing
Legal literature
Lexicography
Law dictionaries